Mile Protić (born 2 October 1950) is a Serbian former professional basketball coach.

Coaching career 
Protić coached Belgrade-based team Crvena zvezda of the Yugoslav First Federal League over 8 games during the 1978–79 season. He coached Bulgarian team Levski Sofia in the first half of the 1990s where he won two Bulgarian League championships (1992–93, 1993–94) and one Bulgarian Cup (1993).

Protić was a youth coach for Balkan Botevgrad.

Protić was a coach at the Crvena zvezda youth teams. In recent years, he has been working as a youth coach in Qingdao, Shandong, China.

Protić owns a Belgrade-based club Probasket for a youth development.

Personal life 
In July 2016, Serbian coach Dušan Ivković reportedly tried to attack Protić after a quarrel with him at the basketball clinic in the Šumice Center.

See also 
 List of Red Star Belgrade basketball coaches

References

External links 
 Mile Protić at eurobasket.com
 Profile at athlenda.com

1950 births
Protic, Mile
KK Beovuk 72 coaches
KK Crvena zvezda head coaches
KK Crvena zvezda youth coaches
KK Milicionar Beograd coaches
Serbian men's basketball coaches
Serbian expatriate basketball people in Bosnia and Herzegovina
Serbian expatriate basketball people in Bulgaria
Serbian expatriate basketball people in China
Serbian expatriate basketball people in Croatia
Serbian expatriate basketball people in Cyprus
Yugoslav basketball coaches